Kung Fu Dino Posse is an animated television series created by Peter M. Lenkov and produced by Cookie Jar Entertainment Inc., Sunwoo Entertainment Co. Ltd., Sunwoo Asia-Pacific Pte. Ltd., and Optix Entertainment GmbH. It premiered on CITV in the United Kingdom on 2 October 2010. In the past, it also aired on Starz Kids & Family in the United States and YTV and Vrak (French Canadian Dub) in Canada.

Main characters

Kung Fu Dino Posse
Kane: (voiced by Matthew Gorman) A Green Tyrannosaurus rex, and the leader of the Posse. He is the most headstrong (perhaps too headstrong) and confident of the Posse, and his just heart won't let Skor get away with his evil plans. Sometimes, he can get a little too serious with the task at hand, and his pride can get the better of him in some situations, but he is a natural leader and will be first to the rescue when his friends are in trouble. Apparently, he prefers quieter hobbies, (previously didn't like loud music) and is still less familiar with the modern world.
Lucy: (voiced by Laura Kolisnyk) A Yellow Triceratops, and the only girl in the Posse. She is quite resilient, calm, collected, and can follow and enforce orders from Kane without hesitation, but can be quite sarcastic. She is quite worldly and knowledgeable of the time of the dinosaurs and the modern era. She is seemingly quite into "girl stuff" in the modern era, such as having "girl talks", and her mannerisms and personality also reflect this, she sometimes gets annoyed with Jet and Chow's immature remarks or actions.
Jet: (voiced by Brent Hirose) An Orange Pteranodon. Comes off as the most street smart and (modern) worldly of the Posse, especially in terms of language (referring to many people as "Dudes"). He comes off as rude, somewhat of a jerk and a comic relief, and full of himself but can be helpful, and quick to cover up a situation with words to those who are unaware. At times, he can be quite hasty which gets him captured or into trouble, usually as a result of trying to command the Posse, and take charge from Kane.
Chow: (voiced by Nolan Balzer) A Red Stegosaurus who has a voracious appetite. The largest and physically strongest dino in the Posse, and not exactly the smartest dino out there and can come off as somewhat clumsy and naïve, and more often than not, his appetite gets the best of him, but he is a very friendly and kind, dinosaur, just don't hide food from him. He seems quite quick to adapt and mimic the personalities and mannerisms of different people and new situations.

Friends of the Posse
Edgar Chudley: (voiced by Simon Miron) He aids the Posse with his knowledge in mathematics, science and technology. Sometimes his knowledge and overthinking is too much for the Posse. He lives in the museum with the posse.
Polly: (voiced by Amy Tang) Another friend of the posse, who studies in the field of paleontology. Edgar has a crush on her.

Secondary characters
Agatha Dimplecorn: (voiced by Gloria Nikkel) She is an elderly lady who is often heckling (unintentionally) with the Kung Fu Dino Posse. 
Professor Sherman Daniels: Polly's grandfather and curator of the museum.

Antagonists
Skor: (voiced by Carey Smith) The main antagonist of the series, and older brother of Skrap, he usually orders Skrap and his other minions to do his dirty work, such as stealing crystals from the Posse, while he stays in his lair. Although both Skor and Skrap are both referred to "raptors" in the first episode, they both have neck frills akin to the Dilophosaurus depicted in the 1993 film Jurassic Park.
Skrap: (voiced by Kevin Michele) Skor's younger, less intelligent brother, who reluctantly takes orders from his brother to do his dirty work. His regular incompetence with tasks disappoints and annoys Skor.

Episodes

References

External links

2010 Canadian television series debuts
2011 Canadian television series endings
2010s Canadian animated television series
Canadian children's animated action television series
Canadian children's animated adventure television series
Canadian children's animated comedy television series
Canadian children's animated fantasy television series
ITV children's television shows
Animated television series about dinosaurs
Television series by Cookie Jar Entertainment